= Arakure Ojōsama wa Monmon Shiteiru =

Japanese manga series

- First tankōbon volume cover

あらくれお嬢様はもんもんしている
- Genre: Romantic comedy
- Manga
- Written by: Yuichi Kinoshita
- Published by: Kodansha
- Magazine: Young Magazine the 3rd (November 6, 2018 – January 6, 2021); Yanmaga Web (May 2, 2022 – present)
- Original run: November 6, 2018 – present
- Volumes: 9
- icon

Arakure Ojōsama wa Monmon Shiteiru (あらくれお嬢様はもんもんしている; lit. 'The Wild Young Lady Is Feeling Restless') is a Japanese manga series written and illustrated by Yuichi Kinoshita. It was serialized in Kodansha's seinen manga magazine Young Magazine the 3rd from November 2018 to January 2021; the magazine ceased its publication in April 2021 and the manga resumed publication on Yanmaga Web in May 2022. Its chapters have been collected in nine tankōbon volumes as of March 2026.

== Publication ==
Written and illustrated by Yuichi Kinoshita, Arakure Ojōsama wa Monmon Shiteiru started in Kodansha's seinen manga magazine Young Magazine the 3rd on November 6, 2018. The series' last chapter in the magazine was published on January 6, 2021, and the manga entered on hiatus. Young Magazine the 3rd last issue was released on April 6, 2021. The series resumed publication on Yanmaga Web on May 2, 2022. Kodansha has collected its chapters into individual tankōbon volumes. The first volume was released on July 19, 2019. As of March 18, 2026, nine volumes have been released. The series is set to end with the release of its tenth volume.

=== Volumes ===
No.	Japanese release date	Japanese ISBN
1	July 19, 2019	978-4-06-516352-8
2	April 20, 2020	978-4-06-519201-6
3	December 18, 2020	978-4-06-521715-3
4	October 20, 2022	978-4-06-529463-5
5	July 20, 2023	978-4-06-532375-5
6	March 18, 2024	978-4-06-534936-6
7	December 19, 2024	978-4-06-537982-0
8	July 18, 2025	978-4-06-540199-6
9	March 18, 2026	978-4-06-542918-1

== Reception ==
In 2020, the manga was one of the 50 nominees for the sixth Next Manga Awards in the print category; in 2023, it was nominated for the ninth edition, albeit in the web category.
